Tennis events were contested at the 2003 Summer Universiade in Daegu, South Korea.

Medal summary

Medal table

See also
 Tennis at the Summer Universiade

External links
World University Games Tennis on HickokSports.com

2003
Universiade
2003 Summer Universiade